Benjamin Büchel (born 4 July 1989) is a Liechtensteiner professional footballer who plays for FC Vaduz in the Swiss Super League. He plays as a goalkeeper.

Club career
Born in Ruggell, Büchel spent his early career in Liechtenstein with FC Ruggell and USV Eschen/Mauren, as well as Swiss club FC Widnau.

He signed a six-month contract with English club Bournemouth in August 2012. In doing so he became the second player from Liechtenstein to play in England (after Franz Burgmeier, who played for Darlington in the 2008–09 season), and only the fourth Liechtensteiner to play outside the country.

He signed a one-month loan deal with Dorchester Town in February 2013, making three league appearances for the club.

In December 2013 he joined Southern Football League side Poole Town on loan until 18 January 2014, making 6 league appearances for them.

In February 2014 he moved on loan to Havant & Waterlooville, where he made 18 league appearances.

In October 2014 he moved on loan to Welling United.

He was released by Bournemouth at the end of the 2014–15 season, and joined Oxford United in September 2015. On 6 October 2015, he made his debut for Oxford United in a 2–0 win against close rivals Swindon Town in the Football League Trophy. He shared first-choice goalkeeping duties with Sam Slocombe for the 2015–16 season, both keepers making 23 League appearances, but the appointment of Simon Eastwood meant he failed to make any appearances in the first half of the following season and he was told he was free to leave during the January transfer window.

Büchel joined Barnet on an emergency loan in March 2017 and was released by Oxford in May 2017, after the end of the 2016–17 season.

International career
He made his international debut for Liechtenstein in 2008, as a substitute in a friendly against Slovakia.

In 2022, he was named Liechtenstein Footballer of the Year

References

External links

 Benjamin Büchel Interview

1987 births
Living people
Liechtenstein footballers
Liechtenstein international footballers
Association football goalkeepers
FC Ruggell players
USV Eschen/Mauren players
AFC Bournemouth players
Dorchester Town F.C. players
Poole Town F.C. players
Havant & Waterlooville F.C. players
Welling United F.C. players
Oxford United F.C. players
Barnet F.C. players
FC Vaduz players
National League (English football) players
Liechtenstein expatriate footballers
Liechtenstein expatriate sportspeople in England
Liechtenstein expatriate sportspeople in Switzerland
Expatriate footballers in England
Expatriate footballers in Switzerland
English Football League players
Southern Football League players
Swiss Super League players
Swiss Challenge League players